Jorge Luis Preciado Rodríguez (born 9 August 1972) is a Mexican politician affiliated with the PAN. He currently serves as Senator of the LXII Legislature of the Mexican Congress representing Colima. He also served as Deputy during the LIX Legislature, as well as a local deputy in the Congress of Colima.

References

1972 births
Living people
Politicians from Colima City
Members of the Senate of the Republic (Mexico)
Members of the Chamber of Deputies (Mexico)
National Action Party (Mexico) politicians
20th-century Mexican politicians
21st-century Mexican politicians
University of Colima alumni
Members of the Congress of Colima